Brash Young Turks is a 2016 coming-of-age British crime film directed by Naeem Mahmood and co-directed by his brother Ash Mahmood that tells a fast paced struggle love, crime and power, against all odds. The film stars Melissa Latouche, Paul Chiedozie, Tom Bott, Richard Shelton and Julian Glover among a large ensemble cast.

Brash Young Turks premièred at The British Urban Film Festival in September 2015  and was the fastest selling film in the festivals 10 years of existence.

Synopsis 
Set in a stylized and dynamic London, Brash Young Turks follows the interlinking stories of young Londoners dreaming of making it big while wading through oppression, greed and adversity. When troubled teen Mia is plucked from her hellish care home by a gang of charismatic hustlers and go-getters, flashy and fearless, her eyes are opened to a world full of new opportunities and dangers. With dreams of wild success, the group is faced with choices of following secondary careers dominated by big players, or reaching the top of the food chain themselves.

Principal cast 

 Melissa Latouche as Mia
 Paul Chiedozie as Terrell Mackintosh
 Tom Bott as Jimmy
 Richard Shelton as Conrad Holmes
 Charlie MacGechan as Dave
 Kimberley Marren as Shaz
 Annie Cooper as Python Team Leader
 Charles Mnene as My-Boy
 Julian Glover as Louis Hartman  
 Annabelle Lanyon as Mia's Mum
 Zoë Lister as the British Ambassador
 Craig Longstaff as James Howlett
 Munro Graham as DCI Lister
 Vidal Sancho as Lars
 Paul Chan as The Chinese Ambassador
 Tom Benedict Knight as Phillips
 Isla Blair as Newsreader (voice)
 D Double E as The Insider
 English Frank as Badman

Release 
Brash Young Turks premièred at the British Urban Film Festival in 2015 becoming the fastest selling film in their 10-year history. This was followed by a limited theatrical release in the UK. Recently Brash Young Turks had its television début on London Live (TV channel) and is available on digital to Video on demand platforms starting with its release on Amazon Prime Instant Video.

Soundtrack 

Grime artist D Double E wrote and performed the Brash Young Turks movie theme alongside Havva titled 'Empire'  and was released in October 2016.

Critical response 

Brash Young Turks received positive critical response. Hollywood News describing it as "Bold, Brash and Brilliant." In his review, critic Jonathan Baz praised the film's direction as "genius filmmaking from the Mahmood's." FilmDoo described Brash Young Turks as a "brazen and restless crime drama about a brazen and restless generation. Built to be a hyper-sensory experience of fast and dangerous living." Yuppee's Tom Heffernan described the film as "fun, frenetic and physical fable of the coming-of-age of real London youths." Hannah Sayer writing for UK Film Review described Brash Young Turks as "genre defying." University of East London's film magazine 20Four Frames lists the film as a "new urban fantasy." The Evening Standard's Toby Earle praised the film's cinematography as "packing an incandescent punch".

Accolades 

At the 10th annual Movie Video & Screen Awards 2016, Brash Young Turks was awarded Best UK Movie. In addition, lead actor Paul Chiedozie also received an award for Best Emerging Talent for his portrayal of Terrell Mackintosh.

References

External links

 
 

2016 crime films